Netaji Subhas Chandra Bose Setu (also called Netaji Setu) is a bridge over the river Kathajodi a distributary Mahanadi connecting Belleview Point near Judicial Academy in Cuttack to Trishulia. The length of the bridge is 2.88 km and is the longest bridge in Odisha.

It was inaugurated by the Chief Minister of Odisha, Naveen Patnaik on July 19, 2017. It is the first 3 lane bridge in Odisha and reduces the distance between Bhubaneswar and Cuttack by 12 km. It also eases the traffic congestion on NH- 16 that connects twin cities of Bhubaneswar and Cuttack. The bridge was named after Netaji Subhas Chandra Bose who was born and brought up in Cuttack.

References

External links 

 Netaji Subhas Chandra Bose Setu on OpenStreetMap

Bridges in Odisha
Road bridges in India
Memorials to Subhas Chandra Bose
Bridges completed in 2002
2017 establishments in Odisha
Bridges completed in 2017
Transport in Cuttack